Crowthorne railway station is a railway station in the village of Crowthorne in Berkshire, England.  The station is managed by Great Western Railway, who operate services on the North Downs Line from Reading to Guildford, Redhill and Gatwick Airport.

The station has two platforms: platform 1 for services towards Gatwick Airport and platform 2 for services towards Reading.  It has bicycle racks on both platforms, and a car park adjacent to platform 2.

History

Crowthorne station was opened in 1859 as a result of pressure from the governors of Wellington College on the directors of the South Eastern Railway.  The college also contributed £500 towards the cost of building the station, which was originally named "Wellington College for Crowthorne".  This name remained until 17 June 1928, when it was renamed "Crowthorne". The old name board remained until World War II, though, when it was removed to prevent invading parachutists knowing where they were. Crowthorne station is located some 2 km from Crowthorne High Street, where most of the village's shops are located.

The station building fell into disuse after destaffing came in 1967; whilst the goods facilities had ceased in 1964. In 1986-87, the station atmosphere was rejuvenated when the bus stop-style shelter on platform 2 was replaced by a new waiting shelter with the BR logo incorporated in blue (later red) bricks. This was done as part of a job-creation scheme. The original station building at the time served as premises for an electrical contractor, and later a salon. The shelter was altered slightly in later years to include a small ticket office, which is staffed in the morning peak hours. In 2013, the station was beautified with murals painted by students at local schools and patients at nearby Broadmoor Hospital, and signage for Wellington College was once again added.

Later on in the Network SouthEast years, the station was under the North Downs sub-sector of Network SouthEast until privatisation. Management was then passed to Thames Trains, then First Great Western in 2004 (First Great Western Link from 2004 until 2006).

Also at the station is a warning siren, part of the Broadmoor Hospital Security System.

Services
Crowthorne is served by trains approximately every 60 minutes in each direction all week. There are additional trains during peak periods on weekdays.  Most trains operate between Reading and Redhill, with some services continuing to Gatwick Airport during peak hours.

References

Railway stations in Berkshire
DfT Category E stations
Former South Eastern Railway (UK) stations
Railway stations in Great Britain opened in 1859
Railway stations served by Great Western Railway
1859 establishments in England